Epauloecus is a genus of beetles belonging to the family Ptinidae.

Species:
 Epauloecus unicolor (Piller & Mitterpacher, 1783)

References

Ptinidae